Japanese singer-songwriter Ringo Sheena, as a solo musician, has recorded material for eight albums, as well as for various non-traditional albums, singles and side projects. Sheena debuted as a musician in 1998 with the single "Kōfukuron," and released her debut studio album Muzai Moratorium in 1999. She followed this with her second album Shōso Strip and the three-CD single set 
Ze-Chyou Syuu in 2000. During this period she toured extensively, and formed several bands to perform her concerts. One of these, the girls band Hatsuiku Status, performed entirely new compositions for their concert.

In November 2000, Sheena married guitarist Junji Yayoshi, who was a member of her backing band Gyakutai Glycogen, and released the single "Mayonaka wa Junketsu" while pregnant. She gave birth to a son in July 2001.  After a break of over a year, she released a two-CD cover album set called Utaite Myōri: Sono Ichi, in which she collaborated with many famous vocalists, such as Masamune Kusano from Spitz and singer Hikaru Utada. She released her third studio album in 2003, titled Kalk Samen Kuri no Hana.

In 2004, Sheena formed the band Tokyo Jihen, which became her primary musical unit. In 2007 she resumed her solo career to release Heisei Fūzoku, a soundtrack album collaborating with conductor Neko Saito for the film Sakuran. She returned once again in 2009 to release the single "Ariamaru Tomi" and the album Sanmon Gossip for her 10th anniversary year. In 2011, she released the single "Carnation," which acted as the eponymous theme song for the morning drama Carnation.

In 2012, after the break-up of her band Tokyo Jihen, she released the digital single "Jiyū e Michizure" for the drama Ataru. In 2013, to celebrate the 15th anniversary of her debut single, she released the single "Irohanihoheto" / "Kodoku no Akatsuki," followed by the compilation albums Ukina (which compiled her collaborations with other musicians) and Mitsugetsu-shō, a live recording compilation. On her 16th anniversary, she will release Gyakuyunyū: Kōwankyoku, an album composed of covers of songs Sheena had written for musicians during her career.

Since her debut, Sheena has occasionally collaborated with other musicians, most notably Soil & "Pimp" Sessions, with whom she recorded "My Foolish Heart" and "Koroshiya Kiki Ippatsu." Other collaborators include Takashi Taniguchi, her brother Junpei Sheena, Zazen Boys, Mo'some Tonebender, Maboroshi, Rekishi, Towa Tei and Tomita Lab.

This list features every song Sheena has performed in her solo career, as well as any bands associated with her solo career, such as Hatsuiku Status or Yokoshima, but excludes Tokyo Jihen songs.

Songs

Unreleased songs

Notes

References

Sheena, Ringo